This page is about the 101st Cavalry Regiment. The 101st Cavalry Group was its headquarters unit.

The 101st Cavalry Regiment is a unit of the New York National Guard that has existed in various forms since 1838 and which saw service in the American Civil War, the Spanish–American War, the Mexican Border Conflict, World War I, World War II, and Afghanistan. Currently, the regiment consists of one battalion, the 2nd Squadron, 101st Cavalry, which also carries the lineage of the former 1st Battalion, 127th Armored Regiment (founded 1838), and 1st Battalion, 210th Armor (founded 1860).

History

The 101st Cavalry Regiment was constituted on 30 December 1920 from the 1st and 2nd New York Cavalry Regiments and had its headquarters in Brooklyn. The regiment was initially assigned to the 21st Cavalry Division.

The regiment was inducted into federal service in January 1941 and reorganized into the:

 101st Cavalry Reconnaissance Squadron (Mechanized), the former 1st Squadron
 116th Cavalry Reconnaissance Squadron (Mechanized), the former 2nd Squadron
 101st Cavalry Group (Mechanized), its headquarters unit, the former regimental headquarters troop

World War II
With this organization, the group saw combat in northwest Europe during World War II with the XV and the XXI Corps of the U.S. Seventh Army in the Sixth Army Group.  Late in the war it was attached to the 12th Armored Division of XXI Corps.

Among other exploits, troops of the 101st Cavalry captured German field marshal Albert Kesselring as well as the Japanese ambassador to Germany in May 1945. Following the war, the 101st Group was inactivated on 25 October 1945 at Camp Myles Standish, Massachusetts.

Post-War
The regiment was reformed as the 101st Armored Cavalry Regiment on 1 January 1950 with headquarters again at Brooklyn. On 16 March 1959, the unit was retitled the 101st Armored Regiment, which endured until 15 April 1963 when the unit was renamed the 101st Cavalry, reduced in strength to one squadron, and subordinated to the 42nd Infantry Division.Pope, pp. 13–15

In 1993, the 101st was consolidated with the 1st Battalion, 210th Armor, taking the 210th's lineage but keeping its designation as the 101st Cavalry. The 1st squadron of the 101 Cavalry was disbanded in August 2006.

The 2nd squadron remains and is headquartered in Niagara Falls, NY. 2nd Squadron is the reconnaissance squadron of the 27th IBCT, and they consist of A Troop (Mounted), B Troop (Mounted), and C Troop (Dismounted). The 2nd Squadron also carries the lineage of the 1st Battalion, 127th Armor Regiment, which converted into the 2nd Squadron, 101st Cavalry when the New York National Guard reorganized in 2005-2006. The squadron deployed to Afghanistan in 2008 and again in 2012. The Squadron, with additional support from the 27th IBCT, deployed to Ukraine in 2017 in order to support the training of Ukrainian soldiers. Elements of the Squadron deployed to Germany and Horn of Africa in 2022.

Unit Commendations 
Meritorious Unit Commendation - 2005 - Iraq

Philipine Unit Commendation - 1945 - Phillipines

References

Reading
 Clay, Steven E., U.S. Army Order of Battle 1919-1941 (Vol. 2), Fort Leavenworth: Combat Studies Institute Press, 2010.
 Pope, Jeffrey L. and Kondratiuk, Leonid E., Armor-Cavalry Regiments, Washington: National Guard Bureau, 1995.

External links 
 101st Cavalry Regiment World War Two
 WITH THE 101st CAVALRY IN WORLD WAR II 1940-1945
 Official History of the 101st Cavalry Group, Part I
 Official History of the 101st Cavalry Group, Part II
 https://www.nationalguard.mil/News/Article/1959494/ny-national-guard-cavalry-troopers-earn-their-spurs/ - Order of the Spur, September 2019

101
Military units and formations established in 1920
New York National Guard